__notoc__
The NATO-1 visa is a non-immigrant visa which allows representatives from NATO member states, their official staff, and their immediate family members to travel to the United States. Recipients are normally exempt from inspection, and the visa is valid for the duration of the individual's stay in the US.

Heads of state traveling to the U.S. are ineligible for this visa category, even when on official NATO business, and must apply for an A-1 visa regardless of their purpose of travel.  NATO officials and their family members may not utilize the NATO-1 visa if traveling for a purpose other than official business, and must instead apply for the alternate applicable visa category.

See also
 G visa
 Visa policy of the United States § NATO visa

Notes

References

External links
 8 CFR 214.2 (m): Link to Title 8, Code of Federal Regulations.
 Visa wait times: Visa wait times at consulates around the world

United States visas by type